In Greek mythology, Pompholyge was the mother of Asia and Libye by Oceanus, the Titan god of the sea. These daughters are often counted as Oceanids with their mother being Tethys, the Titaness of the sea, in some accounts.

Note

References 

 Robert L. Fowler, Early Greek Mythography. Volume 2: Commentary. Oxford University Press. 2013.

Characters in Greek mythology